A Vanished World (German: Eine versunkene Welt) is a 1922 Austrian silent adventure film directed by Alexander Korda and starring Alberto Capozzi, Victor Varconi, María Corda and Olga Lewinsky. It was based on the novel Serpoletto by Lajos Bíró. A Habsburg archduke enlists as an ordinary seamen. The film won the Gold Medal for Best Dramatic Film at the Milan International Cinema Concourse.

Cast
 Alberto Capozzi - Herzog Peter 
 Victor Varconi - Matrose Vannoni 
 María Corda - Anny Lind (as Maria Palma)
 Olga Lewinsky - Herzogin Mutter 
 Karl Baumgartner - Großherzog 
 Harry De Loon - Adjutant Ridarsky 
 Max Devrient - Kammerdiener Bartel 
 Gyula Szőreghy   
 Paul Lukacs   
 Tibor Lubinszky   
 Ernst Arndt

See also
 The Secret of Satana Magarita (1921)
 The Secret of Johann Orth (1932)

References

Bibliography
 Kulik, Karol. Alexander Korda: The Man Who Could Work Miracles. Virgin Books, 1990.

External links

1922 films
Austrian silent feature films
Austrian adventure films
Films directed by Alexander Korda
Films based on Hungarian novels
Austrian black-and-white films
1922 adventure films
Silent adventure films